Kimi Katkar is a former actress and model, who worked in Hindi films. She was active throughout the 1980s and the early 1990s, and starred in over 50 films, including Adventures of Tarzan (1985) and Hum (1991).

Career
Kimi Katkar made her acting debut in the 1985 film Patthar Dil as a supporting actress. Later that year, she starred in Adventures of Tarzan, where she played the lead opposite Hemant Birje. After the film, she continued to work throughout the late 1980s, followed by notable films such as Mera Lahoo (1987), Dariya Dil (1988), Sone Pe Suhaaga (1988), Gair Kanooni (1989), Jaisi Karni Waisi Bharnii (1989)  and Khoon Ka Karz (1991).

In the hit 1991 film Hum (1991), she played the lead actress opposite Amitabh Bachchan. In the film, she was cast as Jumma. The popular song "Jumma Chumma De" from this movie was picturized on her and was sung by playback singers Sudesh Bhonsle and Kavita Krishnamurthy. Thereafter, she started restricting herself to few movies.

Her last film was Humlaa (1992). During the same time, she refused film offers for Yash Chopra's Parampara. Later, Jackie replaced Amitabh Bachchan and Ramya Krishna were signed for the role which had been offered to Kimi. Katkar quit the Hindi film industry after her marriage to photographer and ad-filmmaker Shantanu Sheorey in 1992. She settled in Melbourne, Australia.

She is associated with the book Shantaram which was written by Gregory David Roberts. Roberts was an Australian fugitive who escaped to India where he worked as an extra in films including Paanch Paapi (1989) which starred Katkar.

Personal life
Katkar married a commercial photographer and advertising film producer Shantanu Sheorey. She has one son, Siddhanth. She stays in Melbourne, Australia and has also been living in Aundh, a suburb in Pune, Maharashtra.

Filmography

References

External links
 

Living people
Indian emigrants to Australia
Katkar,Kimi
Katkar,Kimi
20th-century Indian actresses
Actresses from Mumbai
Year of birth missing (living people)